The Roman Catholic Diocese of N'Zérékoré is a diocese located in the city of N'Zérékoré in the Ecclesiastical province of Conakry in Guinea.

History
 March 9, 1937: Established as Apostolic Prefecture of N'Zérékoré from Apostolic Vicariate of Bamako in Mali
 April 25, 1959: Promoted as Diocese of N'Zérékoré

Bishops
 Prefects Apostolic of N'Zérékoré (Roman rite)
 Fr. Agostino Guérin, M. Afr. (1937.04.16 – 1950)
 Fr. Eugène Maillat, M. Afr. (1951–1959.04.25); see below
 Bishops of N'Zérékoré (Roman rite)
 Bishop Eugène Maillat, M. Afr. (1959.04.25 – 1979.08.13); see above
 Bishop Philippe Kourouma (1979.08.13 - retired 2007.11.27)
 Bishop Raphael Balla Guilavogui (since 2008.12.13)

Other priest of this diocese who became bishop
Emmanuel Félémou, appointed Bishop of Kankan in 2007

See also
Roman Catholicism in Guinea
Immaculate Heart of Mary Cathedral, Nzérékoré

Sources
 GCatholic.org
 Catholic Hierarchy

Roman Catholic dioceses in Guinea
Christian organizations established in 1937
Roman Catholic dioceses and prelatures established in the 20th century
1937 establishments in French West Africa